Medetera truncorum is a species of fly in the family Dolichopodidae. It is found in the  Palearctic .

References

External links
Images representing Medetera at BOLD

Medeterinae
Insects described in 1824
Asilomorph flies of Europe
Taxa named by Johann Wilhelm Meigen